100 Days is a Marathi-language television crime series that aired on Zee Marathi from 24 October 2016 to 17 February 2017. The show starred Tejaswini Pandit, Adinath Kothare and Ramesh Bhatkar in lead roles.

Plot
The story revolves Rani (Tejaswini Pandit) and PSI Ajay Thakur (Adinath Kothare). It's a murder mystery where Rani's husband Dhananjay (Ramesh Bhatkar) gets murdered. PSI Ajay Thakur is a investigating officer who takes the charge of investigation for this murder.

Cast 
 Tejaswini Pandit as Rani Dhananjay Sardesai
 Adinath Kothare as PSI Ajay Thakur
 Ramesh Bhatkar as Dhananjay Sardesai
 Seema Chandekar as Sunita Thakur
 Ashwini Mukadam as Rani's maid
 Archana Nipankar as Neha, Ajay's girlfriend
 Siddheshwar Zadbuke as Sharad
 Milind Safai as Sardesai's friend
 Abhishek Chavan as Rani's boyfriend

Reception 
The series premiered from Monday to Saturday at 10.30 pm by replacing Ratris Khel Chale.

References

External links 
 
 100 Days at ZEE5

Marathi-language television shows
Zee Marathi original programming
Indian crime television series
2016 Indian television series debuts
2017 Indian television series endings